The Moederkerk (Mother Church), is a place of worship of the Dutch Reformed Church in George. The church was built in 1842. The cornerstone for the church was laid on 14 April 1832. Slaves were used for some of the building work like the digging of the six-foot deep by five-foot wide foundations. Due to financial problems it took 12 years to complete the church and it was consecrated on 9 October 1842. Although a historical building, the church is still active and sermons are held every Sunday.

List of ministers
 Tobias Johannes Herold, 1823 - 1831
 Johan Stephen Simeon Ballot, 1831 - 1862 
 Arnoldus Gerhard Mart Kuys, 1863 - 1877
 Christoffel Frederic Jacobus Muller, 1877 - 1887
 Zacharias Johannes de Beer, 1887 - 1895 
 David Jacob Johannes Rossouw, 1896 - 1912
 Pieter Truter Stroebel, 1902 - 1904 
 Jan Andries Beyer, 1912 - 1923 
 Johannes Albertus Hurter, 1921 - 1936
 Philip Petrus van der Merwe, 1925 - 1928
 Gabriël Jacobus Lötter, 1931 - 1947 
 Jan Stephanus Klopper, 1937 - 1948
 Daniel Francois du Toit, 1943 - 1947, 1951 - 1967 
 Johan George Lochner, 1947 - 1950 
 Heinrich Franz Heyman, 1947 - 1951
 Carl Wilhelm Irene Pistorius, 1948 - 1953
 Andries Gustav Stephanus Gouws, 1953 - 1958
 Jacobus Stephanus Marais, 1967 - 1970
 Bernard Christiaan Lategan, 1968 - 1969 
 Johannes Gerhard Moolman, 1974 - 1983
 J.A. van de Merwe. 1978 – 2006
 M. van Rooijen. 1988 – 1998
 W. Badenhorst. 1984 – 2004.
 H.A. Louw. 1993 – current.
 H. Bekker. 2005 – current.

External links
 Website of the congregation

George Moederkerk
George Moederkerk
George Moederkerk
Buildings and structures in the Western Cape
19th-century religious buildings and structures in South Africa